Philadelphia Charter School for Arts and Sciences at H.R. Edmunds is a charter school located in the Northwood neighborhood of Philadelphia, Pennsylvania. It is located in the former Henry R. Edmunds School building. The building was designed by Irwin T. Catharine and built in 1923–1924. It is a three-story, nine-bay, brick building on a raised basement in the Colonial Revival style. It features a projecting entrance pavilion, stone cornice, and brick parapet.

It was added to the National Register of Historic Places in 1988.

References

External links

School buildings on the National Register of Historic Places in Philadelphia
Colonial Revival architecture in Pennsylvania
School buildings completed in 1924
Northeast Philadelphia
Charter schools in Pennsylvania
1924 establishments in Pennsylvania